James Halperin may refer to:

James L. Halperin, American businessman
Jimmy Halperin, American jazz musician